Mesoparapylocheles is an extinct hermit crab genus which existed during the Mesozoic in what is now Europe. It was described by René H.B. Fraaije, Adiël A. Klompmaker and Pedro Artal in 2012. The type species is Mesoparapylocheles michaeljacksoni from the Albian or Cenomanian of Spain; which was named after the singer Michael Jackson. Genus also includes other species from the Late Jurassic (Kimmeridgian) of Germany and from the Late Jurassic (Tithonian) of Austria.

Species
Mesoparapylocheles jaegeri Fraaije, 2014
Mesoparapylocheles janetjacksonae Fraaije, Van Bakel, Jagt & Skupien, 2020
Mesoparapylocheles michaeljacksoni Fraaije, Klompmaker & Artal, 2012 (type)
Mesoparapylocheles schweigerti Fraaije, 2014
Mesoparapylocheles strouhali Fraaije, Robins, van Bakel, Jagt & Bachmayer, 2019
Mesoparapylocheles zapfei Fraaije, Robins, van Bakel, Jagt & Bachmayer, 2019

See also
List of organisms named after famous people (born 1950–present)

References

Hermit crabs
Early Cretaceous crustaceans
Late Jurassic crustaceans
Fossil taxa described in 2012
Fossils of Spain
Kimmeridgian genus first appearances
Cenomanian genus extinctions
Cretaceous Spain
Jurassic Austria
Jurassic Germany
Tithonian genera
Berriasian genera
Hauterivian genera
Valanginian genera
Barremian genera
Aptian genera
Albian genera
Jurassic arthropods of Europe
Early Cretaceous arthropods of Europe
Late Cretaceous crustaceans
Fossils of Germany
Fossils of Austria
Late Cretaceous arthropods of Europe